is a passenger railway station in the town of Tokigawa, Saitama, Japan, operated by East Japan Railway Company (JR East).

Lines

Station layout
The station consists of two opposed side platforms serving two tracks, which form a passing loop on the single-track line. The platforms are connected by a level crossing. The station is unattended.

Platforms

History
The station opened on 24 March 1934. The station building was destroyed in a fire on 8 November 1988, and a new building was completed on 18 September 1989.

Passenger statistics
In fiscal 2010, the station was used by an average of 454 passengers daily (boarding passengers only).

Surrounding area
Tamagawa Post Office
Former Tamagawa Village Hall

See also
 List of railway stations in Japan

References

External links

  

Stations of East Japan Railway Company
Railway stations in Saitama Prefecture
Hachikō Line
Railway stations in Japan opened in 1934
Tokigawa, Saitama